Anoectochilus, commonly known as marbled jewel orchids or filigree orchids, is a genus of about fifty species in the orchid family Orchidaceae. They are terrestrial herbs with a creeping rhizome, an upright flowering stem and dark coloured leaves with contrasting veins. The flowers are relatively large and have a large labellum, markedly different from the sepals and petals.

Description
Orchids in the genus Anoectochilus are terrestrial, perennial, deciduous, sympodial herbs with a creeping, above-ground rhizome with wiry roots that look woolly. The leaves are arranged in a rosette and are relatively broad and thin. They are dark green or brownish purple and have a contrasting network of silvery or reddish veins. The flowers are relatively large, hairy, velvety, resupinate and arranged in a short spike. The dorsal sepal and petals overlap to form a hood over the column with the lateral sepals spreading apart from each other. The labellum is relatively large with two sections - an upper "epichile" and lower "hypochile" separated by a narrow section. The hypochile has a cylinder-shaped spur containing two large glands and is joined to the epichile with a "claw" that has spreading teeth or a long fringe. The fruit is a hairy capsule containing a large number of winged seeds.

Taxonomy and naming
The genus Anoectochilus was first formally described in 1825 by Carl Ludwig Blume and Anoectochilus setaceus was the first species he described, hence it is the type species. The genus name is derived from the Ancient Greek words anoiktos (ἀνοικτός) meaning "opened" and cheilos (χεῖλος) meaning "lip".

Distribution
Orchids in this genus range from the Himalayas to south China, Southeast Asia, Australia, New Guinea, Melanesia and Hawaii, found in moist areas with deep shade.

List of species
The following is a list of species recognised by the World Checklist of Selected Plant Families as at May 2018:

 Anoectochilus albolineatus  (1874) : white lines anoectochilus (Myanmar, Thailand, Vietnam)
 Anoectochilus albomarginatus  (1855)
 Anoectochilus annamenis (2007) (Vietnam)
 Anoectochilus baotingensis  (2003) (China, Hainan)
 Anoectochilus brevilabris  (1840) : short-lipped Anoectochilus
 Anoectochilus brevistylus  (1907)
 Anoectochilus burmannicus  (1922)
 Anoectochilus calcareus  (1996 publ. 1997). 
 Anoectochilus dewildeorum  (Sumatra)
 Anoectochilus dulongensis  (Sumatra)
 Anoectochilus elatus  (1857). 
 Anoectochilus emeiensis  (1982)
 Anoectochilus falconis  (2005) (Malaysia)
 Anoectochilus flavescens  (1825). 
 Anoectochilus formosanus  (1914).
 Anoectochilus geniculatus  (1896) (Thailand, Malaysia, Sumatra)
 Anoectochilus hainanensis  (2008). 
 Anoectochilus imitans  (1906). 
 Anoectochilus insignis  (1911). 
 Anoectochilus integrilabris  (1935). 
 Anoectochilus kinabaluensis  (1994). 
 Anoectochilus klabatensis  (2002). 
 Anoectochilus koshunensis  (1914). 
 Anoectochilus longicalcaratus  (1922). 
 Anoectochilus longilobus  (2014). 
 Anoectochilus lylei  (1925). 
 Anoectochilus malipoensis  (2010). 
 Anoectochilus monicae  (2004).
 Anoectochilus nandanensis  (2015). 
 Anoectochilus narasimhanii  (2003). 
 Anoectochilus nicobaricus  (1978 publ. 1979). 
 Anoectochilus papillosus  (2007). 
 Anoectochilus papuanus  (1984 publ. 1985).
 Anoectochilus pectinatus  (1907). 
 Anoectochilus pingbianensis  (1996). 
 Anoectochilus regalis  (1858). 
 Anoectochilus reinwardtii  (1858).  
 Anoectochilus rhombilabius  (2002).
 Anoectochilus roxburghii  (1839). 
 Anoectochilus sandvicensis  (1840)
 Anoectochilus setaceus  (1825) : bristly anoectochilus (type species)
 Anoectochilus subregularis  (1996). 
 Anoectochilus sumatranus  (2001). 
 Anoectochilus xingrenensis  (2002). 
 Anoectochilus yatesiae  (1907) (Queensland) 
 Anoectochilus zhejiangensis  (1989).

References

External links
 
 
 Anoectochilus
 Use of Anoectochilus formosanus - Patent 7033617 
 Photo and some information about Anoectochilus formosanus 

 
Cranichideae genera
Orchids of India
Orchids of China
Flora of Hawaii
Orchids of Thailand
Orchids of New Guinea
Orchids of Malaysia
Orchids of Indonesia
Orchids of Queensland
Flora of the Southwestern Pacific
Flora of the Indian subcontinent
Orchids of Sri Lanka